Moses Galante (died 1806) was chief rabbi of Damascus during the late 18th century and early 19th century.

He succeeded his father, Mordecai Galante, who was chief rabbi until his death in 1781. Moses Galante was also a noted scholar and the author of Berak Mosheh (responsa) [Ḥazan, Ha-Ma'alot li-Shelomoh], published 1780 in Livorno.

References

See also
Galante (pedigree)

1806 deaths
People from Damascus
Chief rabbis of cities
Sephardi rabbis in Ottoman Syria
18th-century births
Place of birth unknown
Date of death unknown
Place of death unknown
Year of birth unknown
Exponents of Jewish law
Authors of books on Jewish law